Girls' Generation is the eponymous debut studio album by South Korean girl-group Girls' Generation. Released by S.M. Entertainment on November 1, 2007, the album spawned three singles; Into the New World in August 2007 as their debut and Lead single, the title track released same date with the album in November 2007, and "Kissing You" in January 2008. A reissue titled Baby Baby, with its single of the same name, was subsequently released on March 13, 2008.

The tour Girls' Generation Asia Tour Into the New World was used to promote the album, along with music shows promotion before the tour, which started on December 19, 2009, in Olympic Fencing Gymnasium, Seoul, South Korea, ended in Taipei Arena, Taipei, Taiwan on October 17, 2010.

Singles
"Into the New World" was initially released as Girls' Generation's debut single album, on August 2, 2007. The group started promoting the song on the SBS's music show The Music Trend on August 5, and subsequently had it reached number one on Mnet's M! Countdown on October 11. It was later included on this album. 

The lead single, "Girls' Generation", written and produced by Lee Seung-Chul and Song Jae Jun, was released on November 1, 2007. The song was originally sung by Lee Seung-Chul in the 1980s. The original singer later appeared on KM's M!Countdown with the group to perform the song together.

In early 2008, Girls' Generation began promoting their second single, "Kissing You". The song won the group their first K-chart win, after achieving the number one position on the KBS's Music Bank February chart. It also achieved the number one spot on three major TV music rankings: SBS's Inkigayo, Mnet's M.Countdown! and KBS's Music Bank.

The third single, "Baby Baby" was released on March 17, 2008. It was the lead single of the repackaged album of the same name.  The music video for the song contained scenes of the making of video of the "Girls' Generation" music video, and footage of the members working on the debut album.

Commercial performance
Within its first month of release, the album sold 49,438 copies and was the 2nd best-selling album of November 2007 in South Korea, only behind Super Junior's Don't Don. The album sold a total of 56,804 copies in 2007, becoming the 12th best-selling album of the year in the country. The album surpassed 100,000 sales mark in March 2008; in doing so, Girls' Generation became the first girl group to achieve such a feat after S.E.S. for six years.

As of September 2008, the album's total sales figures combined with those of the reissue, Baby Baby, have exceeded 126,269 units.

Track listing
Credits adapted from Naver

Personnel
Credits for Girls Generation are adapted from AllMusic.
 Girls' Generation – primary artist
 K Strings – performer, strings
 Sam Lee – guitars

Charts

Weekly charts

Monthly charts

Year-end chart

Release history

Notes

References 

Girls' Generation albums
SM Entertainment albums
2007 debut albums
Korean-language albums